Buchs AG railway station is a railway station in the municipality of Buchs, in the Swiss canton of Aargau. It is an intermediate stop on the  gauge Schöftland–Aarau–Menziken line of Aargau Verkehr.

The station is not be confused with Buchs SG railway station (located in Buchs, canton of St. Gallen) or with Buchs-Dällikon railway station (located in Buchs, canton of Zürich).

Services
The following services stop at Buchs AG:

References

External links 
 

Railway stations in the canton of Aargau
Aargau Verkehr stations